Eulimella torquata is a species of sea snail, a marine gastropod mollusk in the family Pyramidellidae, the pyrams and their allies.

Distribution
This species occurs in the Atlantic Ocean off Southeast Brasil

References

 Pimenta A.D., F.N. dos Santos & R.S. Absalão (2011) Taxonomic revision of the genus Eulimella (Gastropoda, Pyramidellidae) from Brazil, with description of three new species. Zootaxa 3063: 22-38

External links
 To World Register of Marine Species

torquata
Gastropods described in 2011